Newcleus was an American electro and old school hip hop group that gained popularity in the early 1980s. The group is primarily known for its 12-inch single "Jam-On's Revenge" (re-released as "Jam on Revenge (The Wikki-Wikki Song)" (1983)) and "Jam on It" (1984), which began as an anti-rap joke, according to founding member DJ and producer Ben Cenac. At the time (1981) we were going by the name Positive Messenger and were making music that had a purpose, either messages of love or faith or talking about the conditions of the world. However, we were still doing lots of Hip-Hop jams with our DJ crew Jam-On Productions. So, one of our DJs, Salvador Smooth, kept nagging me to do a Rap song. Having come out of Hip-Hop street battles in Brooklyn in the ’70s, I didn't really think much of the Rap records that were playing on the radio, so I figured as a joke I would make a parody jam ... I threw in an idea from an [event] that actually had happened in the ’70s, when a DJ who we had just blown out in a battle said to me "Yeah, you guys are bad, but you can't do this… wikki wikki wikki wikki," meaning how we didn't scratch on the turntables. I used to play "Jam-On's Revenge" at our parties and it would fill the dance floor, so even though I had never planned to release it, when I was shopping Positive Messenger for a deal I put it on the tape just to fill out space at the end. Turned out it ended up being the track that drove everybody crazy! So, we went with it and changed our names to Newcleus." The group was based in the Bedford-Stuyvesant neighborhood of Brooklyn, New York. Their appearance overlapped with the formative years of hip-hop DJing in the Bronx.
The beat from their 1984-song "Automan" was adapted by euro-dance project  "Snap!" for their 1992-release "Rhythm is a Dancer" which featured lyrics written and performed by American singer and songwriter Thea Austin as well as rap vocals by American rapper Turbo B and became a major international hit.

Formation
A precursor to the group, known as Jam-On Productions, was formed in 1977 in Brooklyn, New York City, and included teenagers Ben "Cozmo D" Cenac and his cousins Monique and Pierre "Pete" Angevin. The group's popularity grew as it played block parties in Brooklyn. By 1979, the primary group's members were Cenac, Yvette "Lady E" Cook (who would later marry Cozmo D), Monique Angevin, and Bob "Chilly B" Crafton (who would later marry Angevin). The coming together of families inspired the name change to Newcleus.

Singles
Newcleus recorded "Jam-On Revenge," a block-party favorite featuring vocals that were sped up. The track impressed record producer Joe Webb, and it became the group's first single in 1983 on Mayhew Records. Retitled as "Jam On Revenge (The Wikki-Wikki Song)", the track reached the Top 40 on the US R&B chart. The group eventually signed with Sunnyview Records, which was later acquired by Rhino Records in the 1990s.

The follow-up, "Jam on It," did well on the Billboard Hot 100, reaching No. 56. "Computer Age (Push the Button)" reached the R&B Top 40. The Cenacs and the Craftons continued to record until 1989.

Albums
Neither Newcleus album, Jam on Revenge nor Space Is the Place, sold well. Jam on Revenge is now regarded as a classic, not only because of the well-known singles, but also because of album cuts such as "Destination Earth."

The group released several albums during the following years, but these were the creations of producers putting out material under the Newcleus name. Some of these featured classic Newcleus tracks touted as live versions (but simply added crowd noise atop the original tracks).

In 2005, Cozmo D released an album, Destination Earth: The Definitive Newcleus Recordings, a collection of hip-hop tracks from the group's entire catalog. This collection superseded the Rhino/Atlantic Records compilation Jam on This! The Best of Newcleus. The majority of the songs on this release were restored and remastered from the original master tapes. The definitive versions of the songs "Destination Earth" and "Why" taken from this CD were also released on 12-inch vinyl on the German record label Dominance Electricity. Together with remixes by Sbassship and Reeno, the cover illustrations are by Bill Wray (known for his work on the 1990s cult TV cartoon The Ren & Stimpy Show).

Newcleus is working on a second collection titled Returned to Earth, a companion volume to Destination Earth, which will collect all of its electro works onto one disc, restored and remastered from the original tapes.

Although both Newcleus albums, Jam on Revenge and Space Is the Place, have been remastered and reissued on CD, the song "Where's the Beat" from Jam on Revenge was removed from the track listing because Sunnyview insisted on including the track on the original album, even though it was not recorded or produced by the group. These albums were previously available in the United States only on vinyl and audio cassette. However, both albums' original track listing and cover art were also available on CD, manufactured and distributed by Bellaphon Germany through Sunnyview Records in 1988.

Media appearances
"Jam On It" is heard in a Halloween party sequence in Blind, the first of non-fiction filmmaker Frederick Wiseman's four films released in 1986 about the Alabama Institute for the Deaf and Blind.

Newcleus' songs have been used in several video games. "Computer Age" appears in Mat Hoffman's Pro BMX, and "Jam On It" appears in both Dance Dance Revolution Ultramix 2 and DJ Hero 2, the latter featuring a newly re-recorded version of the song.

Personal matters
Chilly B died at age 47 of a stroke on February 23, 2010.

Discography

Albums
 1984: Jam on Revenge (Sunnyview Records SUN 4901) – No. 84 UK
 1985: Space Is the Place (Sunnyview Records SUN 4903)

Compilations
 1990: Jam on This (Bellaphon Records 260-07-158)
 1994: Next Generation (Unidisc Records SPLK-7230)
 1997: Jam on This!—the Best of Newcleus (Rhino/Atlantic 72840)
 1997: The Next Generation (Home Base/Hot Productions HTCD 66144-2)
 2004: Destination: Earth—the Definitive Newcleus Recordings (Jam-On Productions JORCD 011)
 2006: Newcleus Classic Double Pack (Deeplay Soultec D-TEC LP 1)

Singles
 1983: "Jam-On Revenge Parts 1 and 2" (May Hew Records M-553)
 1984: "Jam On Revenge (The Wikki Wikki Song)" b/w "Jam On Revenge" (The Wikki Wikki Rap) / (Instrumental) (Sunnyview Records SUN 408)
 1984: "Jam On It" (vocal/instrumental) (Sunnyview Records SUN 411) – #56 U.S.
 1984: "Computer Age (Push the Button)" (vocal/instrumental) (Sunnyview Records SUN 416) – NOTE – The promotional issue features an otherwise unreleased Club Version with runs 8:55.
 1984: "Automan" (Special Edit) b/w "Where's the Beat" (Special Edit) / Automan (Dub Version) (Sunnyview Records SUN 420)
 1985: "Destination Earth (1999)" (New Version) b/w "Jam On Revenge" (Dub Versions 1 and 2) (Sunnyview Records SUN 422)
 1984: "Two Slices of Jam" (Sunnyview Records SUNYL 103)
 1985: "I Wanna Be a B-Boy" (Sunnyview Records SUN 425)
 1985: "Let's Jam" (Sunnyview Records SUN 427)
 1985: "Space Is the Place"/"Cyborg Dance" (Sunnyview Records SUN 429)
 1986: "Jam on Revenge (The Wikki-Wikki Song)" (Powderworks POWT 0321) – #44 UK
 1986: "Na Na Beat" (Sunnyview Records SUN 436)
 1987: "Huxtable House Party" (Super Power Records HSE 1232)
 1988: "Mega Mix" (12" mixed) (Bellaphon Records 120.07.271)
 1988: "She's Bad" (Super Power Records HAL 1253)
 1988: "We're So Hyped!" (Super Power Records HAL 1277)
 1990: "50 Ways to Get Funky"/"Jam for the '90's" (May Hew Records 101, 102)
 1990: "Jam on This" (Bellaphon 120-07-383)
 1992: "Jam on It"/"Ex'tra T's Boogie" (with the Extra T's) (Hot Classics HCL 2229)
 1993: "Baby I Love You" ''(Home Base HB 5073) (as Newcleus and The Next Generation)
 1994: "Wikki Wikki"/"Jam on It" / "Jam on This" (Unidisc SP5-1714)
 1999: "Jam on Revenge"/"E. T. Boogie" (Regal Recordings REG35)

Remixes
 2006: "Destination Earth" (Definitive version)—remixes by Sbassship and Reeno; released on Dominance Electricity Records, Germany
 2018: "Teknology – the Third Millennium Remixes" (Jam-On Recordings JOR 006)

References

External links
Jam-On Productions
Official Jam-On Forums
Official Jam-On the Groove Podcast Downloads
Complete discography

American hip hop groups
American boogie musicians
American electro musicians
Musical groups from Brooklyn
Rhino Records artists